Neobiani or nubianie refers to thinly sliced, marinated, and grilled beef. In Korean, the word neobiani means that the beef is sliced into broad sections.

References 

Barbecue
Korean beef dishes
Korean royal court cuisine